Agidel (Ağiźel) is a town in the Republic of Bashkortostan, Russia, located near the border with the Republic of Tatarstan. Population:

Etymology
The name of the town is derived from the Bashkir name of the Belaya (White) River: "Aghidhel", a tributary of the Kama River, near the confluence of which the town is located.

History
It was founded in 1980 as a settlement supporting the construction of the Bashkir nuclear power plant. It was granted town status in 1991.

Administrative and municipal status
Within the framework of administrative divisions, it is incorporated as the town of republic significance of Agidel—an administrative unit with the status equal to that of the districts. As a municipal division, the town of republic significance of Agidel is incorporated as Agidel Urban Okrug.

Government
As of 2010, the head of the town's administration is Oleg Krysin.

Economy
Since the Chernobyl disaster, the people across entire Russia have been strongly opposed to construction of a nuclear plant in northwestern Bashkortostan.

In September 2010, the regional government of Bashkortostan announced plans about establishing an industrial park in Agidel that would promote local manufacturing of construction materials.

References

Notes

Sources

External links
Official website of Agidel 
Directory of organizations in Agidel 

Cities and towns in Bashkortostan
Cities and towns built in the Soviet Union
Populated places established in 1980